Pink Collar Crimes is a true crime show that airs on CBS. The series focuses on real crimes committed by women and includes interviews with the suspects, victims, private investigators, police, and attorneys involved with the cases.

Episodes

Season 1 (2018)

See also
Bob Nygaard, Psychic fraud investigator who played himself in season 1, episode 3, The Psychic Didn't See Him Coming

References

External links 
 Pink Collar Crimes official page on CBS

CBS original programming
2010s American crime television series
2018 American television series debuts
English-language television shows